Battleship Potemkin is a 2005 album of electronic and orchestral music written by Neil Tennant and Chris Lowe of Pet Shop Boys, to accompany the 1925 silent film Battleship Potemkin by Sergei Eisenstein. It is performed by Tennant, Lowe and the Dresdner Sinfoniker, conducted by Jonathan Stockhammer, with orchestrations by Torsten Rasch. The album was released under the name Tennant/Lowe, as Tennant and Lowe are the composers. The album is produced by the Pet Shop Boys and Sven Helbig.

About the project 

In April 2003, Philip Dodd, director of the Institute of Contemporary Arts in London, approached Neil Tennant and Chris Lowe and suggested that they might write a new score for the film and perform it as a free concert in Trafalgar Square as part of a series of events organised by the Mayor of London, Ken Livingstone.

They wrote the music in the order it would be heard, using a DVD of the film as a guide. From the beginning they resolved to combine electronic music and strings; the lyrics of the three vocal pieces within it were largely inspired by the film's original subtitles, though one – "After All (The Odessa Staircase) " – was also prompted by the role in London of Trafalgar Square as a home of political dissent.

Tennant and Lowe decided to ask Torsten Rasch to orchestrate the work after hearing his song cycle Mein Herz brennt, a record based on the music of the rock group Rammstein which has sold over two million copies worldwide. Torsten Rasch's orchestrations were recorded by the Dresdner Sinfoniker, conducted by Jonathan Stockhammer, in Berlin during July 2004.

Track listing
"'Comrades!'" – 3:52
"Men and Maggots" – 4:57
"Our Daily Bread" – 0:52
"Drama in the Harbour" – 9:00
"Nyet" – 6:14
"To the Shore" – 3:12
"Odessa" – 6:50
"No Time for Tears" – 4:32
"To the Battleship" – 4:34
"After All (The Odessa Staircase)" – 7:23
"Stormy Meetings" – 1:31
"Night Falls" – 5:55
"Full Steam Ahead" – 1:50
"The Squadron" – 4:24
"For Freedom" – 3:17

Personnel
Pet Shop Boys
Neil Tennant
Chris Lowe

Guest musicians
Pete Gleadall  - programming
Torsten Rasch - orchestrations
Jonathan Stockhammer - conductor
The Dresdner Sinfoniker  - orchestra on all tracks except 2, 3, 11, 12 & 13
Dave Clayton - additional programming and keyboards
Markus Schwind - trumpet

Chart performance

Touring The Battleship Potemkin
2004
12 September - Trafalgar Square, London, England.
2005
2 September - Alte Oper, Frankfurt, Germany.
3 September - Museumsmeile, Bonn, Germany.
4 September - Museumsmeile, Berlin, Germany.
5 September - Stadtpark, Hamburg, Germany.
2006
1 May - Swan Hunters Shipyard, Newcastle upon Tyne, England.
20 July - Prager Strasse, Dresden, Germany.
29 July - Gardens of the Royal Palace of La Granja, Segovia, Spain.
2008
11 January - Barbican Theatre, London (ticket only event)

The future 

The performance of the score in Trafalgar Square was one of the season's top events, and drew a crowd of approximately 25,000. In September 2005, Pet Shop Boys and the Dresdner Sinfoniker took the concerts to Germany and performed in Frankfurt (2 September), Bonn (3 September), Berlin (4 September) and Hamburg (5 September) to promote the release of the album.

Another British performance took place on 1 May 2006 at the Swan Hunter’s Shipyard in North Tyneside.

A 7-inch version of the song "No Time For Tears" was officially released as a b-side on the DVD format of the PSB single, *"Minimal". An online exclusive orchestral mix can be heard on the Official website and on the Fundamental: Further Listening 2005-2007 reissue.

Pet Shop Boys performed the score with the BBC Concert Orchestra at the Barbican, London, on 11 January 2008.

Further concerts are planned, with Pet Shop Boys hoping to take it to Moscow, following their successful Live 8 concert in the Russian capital in 2005. In an interview for the BBC in September 2005, Neil Tennant also mentioned that they had approached the governments of Iran and China about performing the film live, but both countries declined the proposal.

Their song "Comrades" was frequently used in the BBC documentary Andrew Marr's History of Modern Britain, episode 4 featuring Margaret Thatcher's career as prime minister.

Live performance reviews
BBC Collective, Trafalgar Square
The Independent, Trafalgar Square

References

Pet Shop Boys albums
Drama film soundtracks
2005 soundtrack albums
Parlophone soundtracks
Alternative versions of soundtracks